Andreas Bernard (born 9 June 1990) is an Italian professional ice hockey goaltender who currently plays for HC Bozen-Bolzano of the ICE Hockey League (ICEHL).

He holds the record for most games played as a foreign goaltender in Liiga, the highest level league in Finland, with 216 regular season games played. Bernard speaks fluent Finnish.

References

External links

1990 births
Ässät players
Bolzano HC players
Germanophone Italian people
Italian expatriate sportspeople in Finland
Italian ice hockey goaltenders
KooKoo players
Living people
Mikkelin Jukurit players
Peliitat Heinola players
SaiPa players
People from Neumarkt, South Tyrol
Sportspeople from Südtirol
EC VSV players